The 1951 Women's Western Open was a golf competition held at Whitemarsh Valley Country Club in Lafayette Hill, Pennsylvania, which was the 22nd edition of the event. Patty Berg won the championship in match play competition by defeating Pat O'Sullivan in the final match, 2-up.

Women's Western Open
Golf in Pennsylvania
Women's Western Open
Women's Western Open
Women's Western Open
Women's sports in Pennsylvania